Arabinda Ghosh (1925-1985) was an Indian politician. He was a Member of Parliament, representing West Bengal in the Rajya Sabha the upper house of India's Parliament as a member of the Communist Party of India (Marxist).

References

Rajya Sabha members from West Bengal
Communist Party of India (Marxist) politicians
1925 births
1985 deaths